Leptodeira frenata, the Mayan cat-eyed snake or rainforest cat-eyed snake, is a species of snake in the family Colubridae.  The species is native to Mexico, Guatemala, and Belize.

References

Leptodeira
Snakes of Central America
Reptiles of Mexico
Reptiles of Guatemala
Reptiles of Belize
Reptiles described in 1886
Taxa named by Edward Drinker Cope